Junaedi (born 5 December 1966) is an Indonesian bureaucrat who serves as the Regent of Thousand Islands since 4 September 2020.

Junaedi obtained a social studies degree from the Yapan Institute of Administration in 1992 and a master's of science degree from the Padjajaran University in 2005. After his graduation, Junaedi began working for the Jakarta city government. He became the city secretary of North Jakarta in 2015 and as the assistant to the deputy governor for environment in 2016.

On 13 July 2017, Junaedi became as the Vice Mayor of North Jakarta. He held the office for a year until he was transferred to the Thousand Islands and became the island's vice regent on 25 September 2018. He became the acting regent two years later on 27 July 2020, after the retirement of the island's regent.

Following parliamentary recommendations and approval, Junaedi became the definitive regent of the islands on 4 September 2020.

References 

Living people
1966 births
Indonesian civil servants
Mayors and regents of places in Jakarta
Regents of places in Indonesia
Padjadjaran University alumni
People from Brebes Regency